Gremyachy is a rural locality (a settlement) in Ramenskoye Rural Settlement, Syamzhensky District, Vologda Oblast, Russia. The population was 791 as of 2002. There are 13 streets.

Geography 
Gremyachy is located 35 km north of Syamzha (the district's administrative centre) by road. Klepikovskaya is the nearest rural locality.

References 

Rural localities in Syamzhensky District